Socialist Voice is the official newspaper of the Communist Party of Ireland (CPI). The paper is published monthly and is also available online. It provides an analysis of political events as well as including historic pieces, book and film reviews and international news. The paper followed on from previous newspapers of the Communist Party of Ireland the monthly The Irish Socialist and weekly bulletin The Irish Workers' Voice.

References

2003 establishments in Ireland
Communist Party of Ireland
English-language communist newspapers
Newspapers published in the Republic of Ireland
Political newspapers published in Ireland
Publications established in 2003